Broad Crag is a fell in the English Lake District. The mountain was gifted to the National Trust in 1923 by the Fell and Rock Climbing Club.

Broad Crag may be climbed en route to Scafell Pike, via a path from Esk Hause or from the route from Crinkle Crags and Bowfell.

References

Hewitts of England
Fells of the Lake District
Nuttalls
Mountains under 1000 metres
Furths